The Korkodon is a river in Magadan Oblast, Russian Far East. The upper reaches of the river are in Omsukchansky District, then it flows across the Srednekansky District in its lower course. The name of the river originated in the Northern Yukaghir language.

The Korkodon basin is a desolate area; there are no settlements, but since the lower reaches of the river are navigable; timber rafting was carried out in the 20th century.

Course 
The Korkodon is the fifth longest tributary of the Kolyma and the third in basin area. It has its sources in the Korkodon Range of the Kolyma Mountains. It heads first roughly northwards within a swampy valley between the Korkodon Range to the west and the Molkaty and Kongin ranges to the east. Halfway through its course it bends and flows west and then southwestwards, fringing the Yukaghir Highlands. In its lower course it meanders and flows through a wide flat valley.

The Korkodon has some very long tributaries. There are over 1,100 lakes in the Korkodon basin, most of them of the thermokarst type (alas), as well as swamps. The river freezes between mid October and mid May, but polynyas may form in the lower reaches.

Fauna
Among the fish species found in the river Arctic char, pike, sucker, lenok and whitefish deserve mention.

See also
List of rivers of Russia

References

External links
Kolyma - Modern Guidebook to Magadan Oblast 

Rivers of Magadan Oblast